David Graham (13 March 1922 – 17 July 2009) was a Northern Irish cricketer. A right-handed batsman and right-arm fast-medium bowler, he played twice for the Ireland cricket team in 1948, making his debut against Yorkshire in June, and then playing a first-class match against Scotland the following month. Graham was born in Belfast in March 1922 and died in Harrow, London in July 2009 at the age of 87.

References

1922 births
2009 deaths
Cricketers from Belfast
Cricketers from Northern Ireland